Marco Scarpelli (1918–1995) was an Italian cinematographer.

Selected filmography
 The Outlaws (1950)
 Strano appuntamento (1950)
 I'm the Hero (1952)
 Red Shirts (1952)
 Cats and Dogs (1952)
 Siamo tutti inquilini (1953)
 Cavalcade of Song  (1953)
 House of Ricordi (1954)
 Schiava del peccato (1954)
 The Art of Getting Along (1954)
 Casta Diva (1954)
 A Day in Court (1954)
 Bravissimo (1955)
 Eighteen Year Olds (1955)
 Altair (1956)
 Supreme Confession (1956)
 Toto in the Moon (1958)
 The Road a Year Long (1958)
 Uncle Was a Vampire (1959)
 Who Hesitates Is Lost (1960)
 Messalina (1960)
 His Women (1961)
 Attack of the Normans (1962)
 Il segno del comando (1971)
 We Are All in Temporary Liberty (1971)

References

Bibliography
 Mitchell, Charles P. The Great Composers Portrayed on Film, 1913 through 2002. McFarland, 2004.

External links

1918 births
1995 deaths
Italian cinematographers
Film people from Bergamo